Duncan Johnson, is a South African actor and television presenter. He is best known for his role 'Marvin Peterson' in the popular serial 7de Laan.

Personal life
He graduated with a bachelor's degree in drama at the University of Stellenbosch.

Career
In 1986, he was the winner of the Fleur du Cap Theatre Award for Most Promising Student. He started professional acting career with minor roles in 1988 home movie Uitdraai. In November 1994, he made a role in the radio broadcast of Kanna hy kô Hystoe.

He is a popular South African presenter works as one of the continuity presenters for the DStv channel M-Net Africa. He starred in the serial on 4Play: Sex Tips for Girls as Doctor #2, which made his mark in South African television. In 2011, he appeared in the variety comedy show Colour TV which was aired on SABC2. In 2019, he was invited to act in the popular television serial 7de Laan. He made his debut in the serial on 25 December 2019 with the role of 'Marvin Peterson'.

Television serials
 4Play: Sex Tips for Girls - Season 2 as Doctor #2
 7de Laan - as Marvin Peterson
 Binnelanders - Season 12 as Altus Brink
 Broken Vows - Season 1 as Maila
 Colour TV - Season 1 as Various Roles
 Een Skoenlapper - Season 1 as Vader Stanley
 Egoli: Place of Gold - Season 18 as Clayton
 Fallen - Season 1 as Senior SARS Official
 Fluiters - Season 1 as Tim Verster
 Getroud met Rugby: Die Sepie - Season 2, 3 and 4 as Jan
 Intersexions - Season 1 as Des
 Lui Maar Op, Belinda - Season 1 as Ian
 Riemvasmaak - Season 1 as Willem Hendriks
 Swartwater - Season 1 as Pastoor
 The Docket - Season 1 as Colonel Marlon van Wyk
 Torings - Season 1 as Solly
 Triptiek - Season 1 as Lappies

Filmography

References

External links
 

Living people
South African male television actors
South African male film actors
South African male stage actors
Year of birth missing (living people)